In the Halls of Awaiting is the debut album by the Finnish melodic death metal band Insomnium. It was released on April 30, 2002 through Candlelight Records.

Track listing

Credits

Insomnium
 Niilo Sevänen − vocals, bass guitar
 Ville Friman − guitar
 Ville Vänni − guitar
 Markus Hirvonen − drums

Additional musicians
 Varpu Vahtera – keyboards

Production & artwork
 Mixed by Anssi Kippo at Astia Studio A
 Mastered by Mika Jussila at Finnvox Studios
 Heikki Kokkonen – photography
 Sakari Lundell – band photos
 Ville Kaisla – booklet design and layout
 Olli-Pekka Suhonen – band logo

References

External links
 In the Halls of Awaiting at Insomnium's official website

Insomnium albums
2002 debut albums